Tigaon Assembly constituency is a Haryana Legislative Assembly constituency in Faridabad Haryana.

List of MLAs

References

Assembly constituencies of Haryana